The Lucayan Formation is a geologic formation in the Bahamas. It preserves fossils dating back to the Early Pleistocene period.

See also 
 List of fossiliferous stratigraphic units in the Bahamas

References

Further reading 
 A. F. Budd and C. Manfrino. 2001. Coral assemblages and reef environments in the Bahamas Drilling Project cores. in R. N. Ginsburg, ed., Subsurface geology of a prograding carbonate platform margin, Great Bahama Bank: results of the Bahamas Drilling Project. SEPM Special Publication 70 41-59

Geologic formations of the Caribbean
Geology of the Bahamas
Neogene Caribbean
Limestone formations
Reef deposits